Myosin regulatory light polypeptide 9 is a protein that in humans is encoded by the MYL9 gene.

Function 

Myosin, a structural component of muscle, consists of two heavy chains and four light chains. The protein encoded by this gene is a myosin light chain that may regulate muscle contraction by modulating the ATPase activity of myosin heads. The encoded protein binds calcium and is activated by myosin light chain kinase. Two transcript variants encoding different isoforms have been found for this gene.

References

Further reading

EF-hand-containing proteins